Coleophora libyca is a moth of the family Coleophoridae. It is found in North Africa.

References

libyca
Moths of Africa
Moths described in 1993